Ghaghra Khan Bari Jame Mosque is a medieval-era mosque located in northern Bangladesh's Sherpur District. It is an example of Mughal architecture, and since 1999, its preservation has been entrusted to the country's Department of Archaeology.

Location 
The mosque is located in the Khan Bari of the Ghaghra Laskar village in Hatibandha Union, Jhenaigati Upazila, Sherpur District, Bangladesh.

History 
The mosque was constructed in the Mughal era. A rock inscription at the door contains Arabic writing which states that the mosque was built in 1028 A.H. (corresponding to 1608 A.D.). Many historians have suggested that the mosque was built at the time of rebel Hirangi Khan by Azimullah Khan.

Description 

There are two firm arches inside the mosque. The mosque has one dome which is 30 feet in length and width. There are 10 small minarets at the top of the mosque too. A door is present in the eastern side. Inside, the mihrab and walls are designed with flowery patterns. The walls, made of gathuni lime and brick-dust, are 4 feet. 58% of the land is the mosque, which is under the waqf by locals. The main building and balcony together makes up 17% with the remaining 41% forming a local cemetery near the building. It is adjacent to the Khan Bari eidgah.

Gallery

See more 
 List of mosques in Bangladesh

References 

Sherpur District
Historic sites in Bangladesh
Mughal mosques
Mosques completed in the 1600s